Cambridge Associates is a privately held investment firm based in the United States. It provides investment portfolio management and advisory services to institutional investors, including foundations and endowments, pensions, private clients, and corporate and government entities. 


History
Cambridge Associates was founded by Harvard College roommates Hunter Lewis and James Bailey in 1973.

The firm initially provided investment research to endowments and foundations, and over time, it expanded its services to investment consulting and portfolio management for many institutional investors, such as endowments, foundations and pensions. Cambridge Associates’ CEO, David Druley, was appointed in 2016 after serving as head of global investments. He succeeded Sandra A. Urie, who served as Chairman and CEO for 16 years. 

On February 3, 2022, it was announced that Cambridge Associates will be taking 115,000 square feet in the Winthrop Center tower for its new headquarters later in the year.

Business
Cambridge Associates has, as of mid-2018, $389 billion in assets under advisement, of which roughly $30 billion is managed for client on a discretionary basis—a 50% increase from 2017. The firm has moved further into the business of investing on behalf of clients in addition to its traditional business of largely recommending investment managers to institutions and wealthy individuals and families.

The institutions that outsource the management of their investment portfolio to Cambridge Associates include the American Red Cross, for its pension and endowment; the University of Louisiana at Lafayette Foundation, and the endowment of Lewis & Clark College.

The Wall Street Journal, Bloomberg and Reuters utilize Cambridge Associates research.

In 2017, the firm laid off 3% of its workforce in the investment staff, performance reporting and data collection areas in order to more closely focus on its portfolio management operations.

Investment services
It offers investment consulting, outsourced portfolio solutions, research services and tools, and performance monitoring across various asset classes. The company also provides services in areas, such as investment objectives, asset allocation, investment management structures and guidelines, investment manager selection and evaluation, and performance monitoring.

References

Financial services companies established in 1973
Companies based in Massachusetts
American companies established in 1973
Privately held companies of the United States
Investment management companies of the United States